The China Scholarship Council (CSC) is the Chinese Ministry of Education's non-profit organization that provides support for international academic exchange with China and is the primary vehicle through which the Chinese government awards scholarships. CSC provides both funding for Chinese citizens and residents to study abroad, and for foreign students and scholars to study in China. The agency predominantly provides scholarships to individuals, including in batches allocated to specific foreign universities.

The State Council of the People's Republic of China first proposed the CSC in 1994, before its establishment in 1996.

The CSC funds a number of Chinese students studying abroad every year, and the same number of international students in China. CSC also manages the National Construction High-Level University Postgraduate Program scholarship, which funds a number of graduate students each year. Moreover, the CSC's elite-track funding mechanism for foreign exchange is the International Cooperative Program for Innovative Talents (ICPIT) program, which funds hundreds of special training programs arising from collaborations between top Chinese and international institutions.

Among its most well-known scholarship programs, the CSC manages the Chinese government award for outstanding self-financed students abroad, which funds about 650 students each year (500 before 2021), these scholarships are designed to encourage Chinese students to return home after completing their studies.

In August 2020, the University of North Texas terminated its relationship with the China Scholarship Council.

According to an October 2020 report by the United States-China Economic and Security Review Commission, certain CSC scholarships require that recipients "support the leadership of the Communist Party and the path of socialism with Chinese characteristics; love the motherland; have a sense of responsibility to serve the country, society, and the people; and to have a correct world view, outlook on life, and values system."

In January 2023, Swedish newspaper Dagens Nyheter reported that Chinese students studying in Sweden and funded by CSC had been required to sign loyalty pledges to the Chinese Communist Party and name guarantors to repay scholarships if the pledges are violated. Radio Free Asia subsequently reported that this practice had been happening for at least a decade and involved tens of thousands of Chinese students studying abroad.

See also 

 Thousand Talents Plan

References

External links

 

Scholarships in China
Government scholarships
Education in China
Higher education in China